Bryan Rose (born 24 July 1943) is a New Zealand former long-distance running athlete who participated in the 1973 IAAF World Cross Country Championships, where he was a member of the Winning New Zealand team.
Also competed in the 1974 Commonwealth Games in the 5,000 metres.
New Zealand Cross-Country Champion 1969.

References

All Athletics profile

Living people
1943 births
New Zealand male long-distance runners
New Zealand male cross country runners
Athletes (track and field) at the 1974 British Commonwealth Games
Commonwealth Games competitors for New Zealand